Tinpahar is a bimonthly, bilingual (English and Bengali) Indian online magazine that promotes art, literature, and culture with the motto, "Free and Fertile".

History
The magazine was established by Arkajit Mandal and Siddharth Sivakumar. The idea of Tinpahar was developed from Resonance, a magazine edited by Siddharth and published by Patha Bhavana and Visva Bharati. It was launched on 14 September 2012.

Activity 
Tinpahar has special columns dedicated to comparative literature, arts, and gender studies in India.

Tinpahar aspires to erase the boundaries between discrete academic disciplines of literature, linguistics, philosophy, sociology, history, anthropology, art history and so on in order to create a "free and fertile" space for constructive discourses on/in humanity. Recently Tinpahar has initiated a programme to support enthusiastic groups engaged in serious cultural endeavours by making them websites for free. The upcoming Tamil website of Tinpahar will act as a platform for students to express themselves on matters of humanities, arts, music, and literature.

In 2014, Tinpahar was the publishing partner of the Poetry Slam hosted by the Literary Society, Presidency University.
In 2015 Tinpahar became one of the Online Media Partners of the Festember festival.

See also 
Little magazine movement
List of literary magazines

References

External links 
 
 The Citizen speaks with Siddharth Sivakumar
Online Magazine Tinpahar to be published in Tamil- The New Indian 
Express

2012 establishments in West Bengal
Literary magazines published in India
Online magazines published in India
Multilingual magazines
Magazines established in 2012
Bi-monthly magazines published in India
Cultural magazines
Poetry literary magazines